Arab Strap are a Scottish indie rock band whose core members are Aidan Moffat and Malcolm Middleton. The band were signed to independent record label Chemikal Underground, split in 2006 and reformed in 2016. The band signed to Rock Action Records in 2020.

History
Vocalist and drummer Aidan Moffat and multi-instrumentalist Malcolm Middleton grew up in Falkirk, Scotland, and bonded over their mutual love for Drag City recording artists such as Will Oldham (who at the time recorded under the name Palace Brothers) and Smog. They began collaborating in 1995, and their debut album, The Week Never Starts Round Here, was released the following year. At this point Gary Miller and David Gow joined the band and became the rhythm section, creating a more dynamic live experience when the band started touring.

Over the course of their ten-year existence Arab Strap worked with numerous musicians, including Jenny Reeve and Stacey Sievewright, as well as Adele Bethel, who went on to form Sons and Daughters. Stuart Murdoch of Belle & Sebastian featured on the album Philophobia, but the Belle & Sebastian album/song "The Boy with the Arab Strap" would later create something of a feud between Moffat and Murdoch.

Arab Strap's marked characteristics include sordid, personal, yet honest, lyrics – described by the NME as "fly on the duvet vignettes". Like fellow Scottish band The Proclaimers, their lyrics are sung in their native Scots tongue. At first essentially an electro-acoustic band with a brooding, spare sound, later albums and gigs saw them develop a fuller sound that drew deeply on both indie and dance music.

Arab Strap's first two albums, The Week Never Starts Around Here (1996) and Philophobia (1998), depicted the desperate decadence of post-Thatcherite Britain. The former album's "The First Big Weekend", a five-minute piece of drunken mayhem that end with a joyous singalong, "Went out for a weekend, lasted forever / Got high with our friends, it's officially summer," which was later also used as the chorus to "Hey!Fever," one of the tracks on the EP The Girls of Summer the following year. The 1999 live album, Mad for Sadness, demonstrated how the sometimes spare recorded sound of their early music could lift into a celebration of a sexually empty, drug- and alcohol-dependent life. After these albums, Arab Strap's music became much more musically polished, but continued to focus on drink, drugs, and existentially bereft versions of sexuality. 
  
In keeping with the theme of sexual allusion, Moffat records as a solo artist under the name Lucky Pierre (later changed to L Pierre) – slang for the man in the middle of a gay threesome. This work is also characterised by a brooding, spare sound, but is instrumental in nature.  Middleton also has a solo career under his own name, releasing two albums with Chemikal Underground and three more via Full Time Hobby Records.

On 9 September 2006, the band announced on their website that they were to split up. They celebrated the ten years since their first studio album with the release of a compilation record, Ten Years of Tears. They went on tour in Europe for the last time at the end of the year, and played their final show at the end of a secret tour of Japan at Shibuya O-Nest on 17 December 2006.

Post-breakup  and 2016 reunion
In a 2008 interview, Middleton stated: "It was a good time to call it a day. Unless there's a definite need and desire for us to play, I don't think we should ever get back together. We always said we would [collaborate again] when we split up, but I think maybe it's still too soon. Maybe in a few years when we've got time, we'll maybe try something for a laugh. Who knows?"

In December 2009, Monday at the Hug & Pint, The Red Thread and The Last Romance entered The Skinny'''s "Scottish Albums of the Decade" list at no. 7, 12 and 25 respectively.

In April 2010, the Scenes of a Sexual Nature box-set was released, featuring early albums, live recordings, and a newly recorded track. The following year Moffat and Middleton released a cover version of Slow Club's new single, "Two Cousins", under the name "Two Cousins 1999".  Moffat noted, "It’s not an Arab Strap performance as such, rather it’s the two guys who used to be Arab Strap recording their own, informed pastiche". On 17 November 2011, the band reformed for a one-off show as part of Glasgow venue Nice N Sleazy's 20th birthday celebrations.

In an interview in April 2013, Middleton said that he would be open to the idea of future gigs, but cast doubt on any more Arab Strap records: "I think, with Arab Strap, it was good at the time. But we could only write songs of that ilk at a certain age. So I don't think we'll ever record again but it might be good to do a gig".

On 11 June 2016 a new website for the band was revealed with a countdown and a lone statement, "Hello Again", teasing a reformation. Arab Strap confirmed on 15 June that they have reformed for three shows at London's Electric Brixton, Manchester's O2 Ritz and Glasgow's Barrowlands Ballroom, all scheduled for October, marking the band's 20th anniversary. With this announcement, the band released a new version of their debut single, titled "The First Big Weekend of 2016", as remixed by Miaoux Miaoux. They later added a second date in Glasgow (after the first one sold out in under half an hour) and a warm-up date in Newcastle. A string of festival dates in 2017 followed.

In August 2019, ahead of the release of his third studio album as Human Don't Be Angry, Middleton's website updated to state that they "[were] currently working on a new album for release in 2020". On 1 September 2020 the band issued their first new material in 15 years, with the release of the single "The Turning Of Our Bones", which is reported to be the A-side of an upcoming 7".  The B-side of the single is to be called "The Jumper".

On 24 November 2020 the band announced their new album, As Days Get Dark, their first in 16 years.

On 17 February 2021 Arab Strap released the music video for "Here Comes Comus!". The controversial music video was directed by Bryan M. Ferguson.

On 5 March 2021 Arab Strap released their new album, As Days Get Dark.

Discography

Studio albums

Live albums

Compilation albums

Extended plays

Singles

References

External links
Arab Strap discography at Discogs
Arab Strap page at Chemikal Underground
Arab Strap Album Reviews on Pitchfork.com
Arab Strap entry at Trouser Press''
Melodic Records
Lazy-i Interview, May 2003
 

Scottish alternative rock groups
Scottish indie rock groups
Musical groups established in 1995
Musical groups disestablished in 2006
Musical groups reestablished in 2016
Musical groups from Glasgow
Sadcore and slowcore groups
Chemikal Underground artists